In enzymology, a nitrite reductase [NAD(P)H] is an enzyme that catalyzes the chemical reaction

ammonium hydroxide + 3 NAD(P)+ + H2O  nitrite + 3 NAD(P)H + 3 H+

The 4 substrates of this enzyme are ammonium hydroxide, NAD+, NADP+, and H2O, whereas its 4 products are nitrite, NADH, NADPH, and H+.

This enzyme belongs to the family of oxidoreductases, specifically those acting on other nitrogenous compounds as donors with NAD+ or NADP+ as acceptor.  The systematic name of this enzyme class is ammonium-hydroxide:NAD(P)+ oxidoreductase. Other names in common use include nitrite reductase (reduced nicotinamide adenine dinucleotide, (phosphate)), NADH-nitrite oxidoreductase, NADPH-nitrite reductase, assimilatory nitrite reductase, nitrite reductase [NAD(P)H2], and NAD(P)H2:nitrite oxidoreductase.  This enzyme participates in nitrogen metabolism.  It has 3 cofactors: FAD, Iron,  and Siroheme.

Structural studies

As of late 2007, only one structure has been solved for this class of enzymes, with the PDB accession code .

References

 
 
 
 
 

EC 1.7.1
NADPH-dependent enzymes
NADH-dependent enzymes
Flavoproteins
Iron enzymes
Siroheme enzymes
Enzymes of known structure